Hibbertia virgata, commonly known as twiggy guinea flower, is a species of flowering plant in the family Dilleniaceae and is endemic to south-eastern Australia. It is an erect shrub with linear leaves and yellow flowers with ten to twelve stamens  arranged around three glabrous carpels.

Description
There are ten to twelve stamens arranged around three glabrous carpels. Flowering occurs from August to December.

Taxonomy
Hibbertia virgata was first formally described in 1817 by Augustin Pyramus de Candolle from an unpublished description by Robert Brown. De Candolle's description was published in his Regni Vegetabilis Systema Naturale.

Distribution and habitat
Twiggy guinea flower grows in heathland, woodland and mallee in New South Wales, Victoria, South Australia and Tasmania. In New South Wales in is found south from near Sydney and in south-western inland areas. It is widespread in Victoria and south-eastern South Australia but is rare in Tasmania, where it is only known from a few locations in the north and north-east of the state.

References

virgata
Flora of New South Wales
Plants described in 1817
Taxa named by Augustin Pyramus de Candolle